Chaya may refer to:

Places
Chaya (Ob), in Tomsk Oblast, Russia, a tributary of Ob River
Chaya (river), in Siberia, Russia, a tributary of Lena River
Chaya, another name for the Chepelare, a river in Bulgaria
Chaya County, in Tibet
Chaya, Afghanistan, a place in Afghanistan

People
Chaya family, a wealthy family of textile merchants based in Kyoto, Japan from the 16th century into the Edo period
Chaya Shirōjirō, merchants within that family, wealthy and influential traders with the official patronage of the Tokugawa shogunate
Afif Chaya (born 1947), Lebanese singer and actor
B. R. Chaya, Indian playback singer
Chaja Rubinstein (1872–1965), Polish-born American business magnate
Chaya Arbel (1921–2007), Israeli composer
Chaya Czernowin (born 1957), Israeli composer
Chaya Gusfield, American attorney and rabbi
Chaya Mushka Schneersohn (fl. 1860), member of the Chabad-Lubavitch Hasidic dynasty
Chaya Mushka Schneerson (1901–1988), member of the Chabad-Lubavitch Hasidic dynasty
Chaya Singh (born 1981), Indian actress
Maxime Chaya (born 1961), Lebanese sportsman and explorer
Chaya Raichik (born 1990), American blogger and owner of Libs of TikTok

Other uses
Cchaya (literature), an ancient tradition of providing Sanskrit glosses (transliterations) for Prakrit word forms, particularly in classical Indian drama plays
Chaya (plant), a vegetable
Chaya tequila, a brand of tequila
Chayah (heb. חיה literally "life"), in Judaism a term for soul, considered a part of Hashem (God)
Chaya (film), a Kannada-language film
Chashitsu (茶室), rooms or small buildings used for the Japanese tea ceremony
Ochaya (茶屋), "teahouse," a Japanese euphemism for traditional drinking establishments of the early modern period

See also
Chhaya (disambiguation)
Shaya (disambiguation)